Sævar Birgisson (born February 15, 1988 in Reykjavík, Iceland) is a cross-country skier from Iceland. He competed for Iceland at the 2014 Winter Olympics in the 15 kilometre classical finishing in 74th place and in Sprint where he lost in the qualifying in 72nd place. The team will also consist of eleven officials.

Birgisson was also selected to carry the flag of Iceland during the opening ceremony.

References

External links
Official website

1988 births
Living people
Cross-country skiers at the 2014 Winter Olympics
Saevar Birgisson
Saevar Birgisson
Saevar Birgisson
21st-century Icelandic people